The 2020 Bulgarian Cup Final was the final match of the 2019–20 Bulgarian Cup and the 80th final of the Bulgarian Cup. The final took place on 1 July 2020 at Vasil Levski National Stadium, Sofia, Bulgaria. On 27 June the Bulgarian Football Union announced that it is allowed for the stadium to host up to 30% of its total capacity (i.e. 12,000 spectators) with up to 3,000 spectators per block in accordance to health regulations, issued by the Ministry of Health in relation to the ongoing COVID-19 pandemic in Bulgaria.

The clubs contesting the final were CSKA Sofia and Lokomotiv Plovdiv. Both teams had met on multiple occasions in the competition but never in the final itself. This was CSKA's 33rd final and the first one since 2016, while Lokomotiv Plovdiv appeared in their 2nd consecutive and 6th overall final.

Lokomotiv Plovdiv won the game after penalties and lifted their 2nd consecutive cup. This victory ensured their qualification to the first qualifying round of the 2020–21 UEFA Europa League. This was the first occasion in the history of the Cup finals in which a team from Plovdiv managed to prevail against a Sofia-based club - in the 15 previous instances the teams from the capital city had emerged victorious. Momchil Tsvetanov joined Krasimir Bezinski and Elin Topuzakov in becoming the player with most cup wins in the history of the tournament. This was his 6th cup in total with a 4th different club after 2008, 2009, 2016, 2018, and 2019.

Route to the Final

Match

Details

References 

Bulgarian Cup finals
2019–20 in Bulgarian football
PFC CSKA Sofia matches
PFC Lokomotiv Plovdiv matches
Bulgarian Cup Final
Bulgarian Cup Final, 2020